Thai Mozhi is a 1992 Tamil-language action film directed by R. R. Ilavarasan, starring Sarath Kumar and Mohini, with Vijayakanth in a special appearance. It was later dubbed in Telugu as Maro Yuddha Kanda.

Plot

Rajasimham (Sarath Kumar), the local rowdy, is orphaned after his widowed mother commits suicide unable to bear the insinuations about her chastity. In the coastal village is rich man Mariadas (Mansoor Ali Khan) whose main occupation is to terrorise the villagers and cavort with his girl friend (Silk Smitha). Mariadas and Rajasimham are enemies from boyhood when the former had manipulated the latter to question his mother's chastity.

Rajasimham takes a fancy for Anthony's (Gemini Ganesan) widowed daughter Mary (Mohini). Rajasimham assists Anthony in his fishing activities. After an encounter with the henchman of Mariadas, Rajasimham is arrested by the police inspector (Vijayakanth) and put behind bars. The inspector, after a few fights with Mariadas crowd, is transferred to Delhi but gets Rajasimham released before leaving. The inspector advises the rowdy to change his ways.

Rajasimham comes back to the village and ekes out his living as a fisherman assisting Anthony. Mariadas, who has an eye on Mary, destroys Rajasimham's boat but he takes it his in stride. Mariadas masterminds the death of Anthony at sea and tries to put the blame on Rajasimham but Mary is not convinced. Unable to get Mary to desert Rajasimham, the rich man uses religion to break up the alliance.

Mary, being a Christian and a widow, cannot stay in the house of Rajasimham, says Mariadas and takes upon himself the job finding a groom for her. One of his henchmen is chosen and Rajasimham, who is lying unconscious after being beaten up by the goons of Mariadas, recovers fast enough to gatecrash into the church and battle his way out with the girl he desires.

Cast
 Sarath Kumar as Rajasimham
 Mohini as Mary
 M. N. Nambiar  as Church Father
 Gemini Ganesan as Anthony
 Mansoor Ali Khan as Mariadas
 Silk Smitha
 Yuvasri as Rajasimman's mother
 Vijayakanth as Inspector Alex (Special appearance)

Songs
The film's songs and background score were composed by Ilaiyaraaja.
"Madurai Veeran" - Ilaiyaraaja
"Singara Maane" - Mano, Swarnalatha
"Kodi Muthukelai" - Mano, S. Janaki
"Jinjilara" - S. Janaki
"Thaai Illa Pillai" - Arunmozhi

Reception
The Indian Express wrote "The weak story and screenplay have deprived the film of punch though the action scenes have been well taken". Sundarji of Kalki found the film boring but praised the locations, dance and fight choreography and panned the music as average.

References

1992 films
Films scored by Ilaiyaraaja
1990s Tamil-language films